"With Malice towards One and All" was the weekly column series published by Indian author and journalist Khushwant Singh in the leading English language dailes of India, occupying two full length columns on the editorial page of the Saturday edition.

Syndication 
His articles appear in The Telegraph, Hindustan Times and then  The Pioneer, with syndication by multiple publications.

Irreverent wit 
The write-up included combination of 3-4 essays, starting usually with commentary on current political, popular culture, literature and socio-economic events. Out of these, one of the essays used to include memoirs of extensive travels by Khushwant Singh, particularly during his extended stays in the UK & Europe.

Column punchline 
His comparisons of social and behavioural characteristics of westerners and Indians, laced with his inimitable wit, was the punchline of this hugely popular series. A short snippet or contributory joke sent in by the readers was usually the last passage of the column.

Mario cartoon 
The accompanying Mario cartoon he used on his column first appeared in the “Editor’s Page” of The Illustrated Weekly of India. It depicted a caricature of himself, sitting next to a pile of books, a bottle of scotch, and a girlie magazine.

External links
http://www.sepiamutiny.com/sepia/archives/003653.html
http://hindustantimes.com/
http://www.dailypioneer.com/

Columns (periodical)